Trevarno may refer to:

Trevarno, Cornwall, estate near Helston in Cornwall, UK
Trevarno, Livermore, California, neighborhood